Olszewnica  is a village in the administrative district of Gmina Borki, within Radzyń Podlaski County, Lublin Voivodeship, in eastern Poland.

The village has a population of 409.

References

Olszewnica